Hills of Peril is a lost 1927 American silent Western film directed by Lambert Hillyer and starring Buck Jones and Georgia Hale.
It was produced and distributed by Fox Film Corporation.

Cast
 Buck Jones - Laramie
 Georgia Hale - Ellen
 Albert J. Smith - Rand
 Buck Black - Grimes's boy
 William Welch - Grimes
 Marjorie Beebe - Sophia
 Duke Green - Jake
 Charles Athloff - Ezra
 Bob Kortman - Red (* as Robert Kortman per AFI)

References

External links
  Hills of Peril at IMDb.com
 
 lobby poster, long style

1927 films
1927 Western (genre) films
Films directed by Lambert Hillyer
Lost Western (genre) films
Fox Film films
Lost American films
American black-and-white films
1927 lost films
Silent American Western (genre) films
1920s American films